Bayonne is an extinct town in Cherry County, in the U.S. state of Nebraska. The GNIS classifies it as a populated place.

History
A post office was established at Bayonne in 1914, and remained in operation until it was discontinued in 1934. The community was named after Bayonne, in France.

References

Ghost towns in Nebraska
Landforms of Cherry County, Nebraska